Langley is a city in Island County, Washington, United States. It sits near the south end of Whidbey Island, overlooking the Saratoga Passage. It is the third largest incorporated area on Whidbey. The population was 1,035 at the 2010 census, while the ZCTA for Langley's post office had a population of 4,878.

Langley is served by South Whidbey Fire/EMS, the Langley Police Department and South Whidbey School District #206; the school district offices are located there. The current mayor is Scott Chaplin.

History
Langley was founded in the 1890s by Jacob Anthes, and was named for J.W. Langley of Seattle. In 1902, Anthes built a logger bunkhouse that still stands in the downtown core (it functions today as the South Whidbey Historical Society Museum). Langley was officially incorporated on February 26, 1913.

At some point in the late 1900s, a number of 4H rabbits escaped their enclosures at the Island County Fair and went on to thrive as a large feral population initially residing around the county fairgrounds and later spreading throughout Langley and south Whidbey Island. In the 2010s the rabbits became a controversial issue in local politics, with citizens and groups advocating for public policy positions from removal and relocation to outright eradication. Some favored controlling the rabbit population using raptors, while other voices advocated for a more lenient position of community acceptance.

Government and politics

The City of Langley operates under a mayor–council form of government. The mayor and city councilmembers are elected to four-year terms. The City Council enacts ordinances and resolutions, holds public hearings, receives citizen comments, authorizes payment of City funds, approves contracts, and creates committees and boards to assist in the operation of city government. The City Council meets on the first and third Monday of each month in City Hall at 5:30pm. The Mayor presides over Council meetings and is responsible for the administration of City government.

The current mayor is Scott Chaplin, elected by the City Council in 2021 to replace the former mayor, Tim Callison who resigned.

Events

Mystery Weekend is a yearly mystery game event occurring the last weekend in February. A fake newspaper story is run in the South Whidbey Record or a fake newspaper can be purchased from the Visitor & Information Center, detailing the persons involved and instructing players to seek out characters played by local residents.

The Welcome the Whales Festival and parade is held at the beginning of April each year.

The Djangofest NW Music Festival is held in September each year. This five-day festival celebrates the gypsy jazz style of Django Reinhardt, and features workshops, concerts, and impromptu jam sessions around town.

The Whidbey Island Area Fair is held in July at the Island County Fairgrounds in Langley. The original Island County Fair Association was formed in 1912, predating the incorporation of Langley itself.

Geography
Langley is located at  (48.036922, -122.408500).

Demographics

2010 census
As of the census of 2010, there were 1,035 people, 555 households, and 271 families residing in the city. The racial makeup of the city was 94.1% White, 0.1% African American, 0.6% Native American, 1.6% Asian, 0.1% Pacific Islander, 0.7% from other races, and 2.8% from two or more races. Hispanic or Latino of any race were 3.2% of the population.

There were 555 households, of which 16.6% had children under the age of 18 living with them, 39.1% were married couples living together, 7.6% had a female householder with no husband present, 2.2% had a male householder with no wife present, and 51.2% were non-families. 43.6% of all households were made up of individuals, and 23.6% had someone living alone who was 65 years of age or older. The average household size was 1.86 and the average family size was 2.51.

The median age in the city was 57 years. 14% of residents were under the age of 18; 3.4% were between the ages of 18 and 24; 14.4% were from 25 to 44; 39.8% were from 45 to 64; and 28.4% were 65 years of age or older. The gender makeup of the city was 40.9% male and 59.1% female.

2000 census
As of the 2000 census, there were 959 people, 486 households, and 268 families residing in the city. The population density was 1,165.9 people per square mile (451.6/km2). There were 542 housing units at an average density of 658.9 per square mile (255.2/km2). The racial makeup of the city was 96.25% White, 0.31% African American, 0.42% Native American, 0.52% Asian, 0.42% from other races, and 2.09% from two or more races. Hispanic or Latino of any race were 1.88% of the population.

There were 486 households, out of which 24.3% included children under the age of 18, 40.9% were married couples living together, 12.1% had a female householder with no husband present, and 44.7% were non-families. 39.9% of all households were made up of individuals, and 21.2% had someone living alone who was 65 years of age or older. The average household size was 1.97 and the average family size was 2.61.

Langley's population was spread out, with 19.7% under the age of 18, 5.8% from 18 to 24, 15.7% from 25 to 44, 35.5% from 45 to 64, and 23.3% who were 65 years of age or older. The median age was 49 years. For every 100 females, there were 76.9 males. For every 100 females age 18 and over, there were 72.3 males.

The median income for a household in the city was $34,792, and the median income for a family was $51,563. Males had a median income of $41,750 versus $30,125 for females. The per capita income for the city was $24,940. About 5.2% of families and 10.6% of the population were below the poverty line, including 10.7% of those under age 18 and 6.6% of those age 65 or over.

References

External links
 City of Langley
 Langley, WA Events and Activities
 South Whidbey Fire/EMS Station 34 – Langley

Cities in Washington (state)
Cities in Island County, Washington